Adam Kopyciński (b. 5 August 1907 in Osielcu near Maków Podhalański  – 3 October 1982 in Wrocław, Poland) was a Polish conductor and composer.

During the Second World War, he was a prisoner in the German concentration camp Auschwitz.

References

1907 births
1982 deaths
Polish conductors (music)
Male conductors (music)
Polish composers
Auschwitz concentration camp survivors
Alumni of the Academy of Music in Kraków
20th-century conductors (music)
20th-century composers
20th-century male musicians